Vaanga Partner Vaanga is a 1994 Indian Tamil-language comedy film directed and produced by Rama Narayanan. The film stars Visu, Radha Ravi, S. S. Chandran and Vennira Aadai Moorthy. It was released on 14 January 1994.

Plot

Ponnappan, Uzhagappan and Azhagappan are three naive villagers who come to Chennai for becoming wealthy. However, they are cheated by the townsfolk. They decide to join hands and they begin to look for an intelligent, bachelor and a good partner. The first one who comes to their mind is the lord Ganapathi. They then sign a contract with the lord (statue) : in five years time, Ganapathi will have the quarter of their benefit. The Gurukkal is the witness of this deal. To help them, Ganapathi himself appears as a human and he becomes their partner. Five years later, Ponnappan, Uzhagappan and Azhagappan become wealthy and arrogant men. One day, the Gurukkal asks them the quarter of their benefit as promised to build a temple but Ponnappan, Uzhagappan and Azhagappan refuse it categorically. Ganapathi is shocked for being betrayed and decides to teach them a lesson.

Cast

Visu as Ganapathi
Radha Ravi as Ponnappan
S. S. Chandran as Uzhagappan
Vennira Aadai Moorthy as Azhagappan
Vivek as Koteeswaran
Chinni Jayanth
Silk Smitha as Menaka
Kovai Sarala as Pawn
Vinodhini as Vairam
Ra. Sankaran as Gurukkal
Kumarimuthu as Sreenivasan
Manisamy
Karuppu Subbiah
Thayir Vadai Desigan
Idichapuli Selvaraj
T. K. S. Natarajan
Kullamani
Marthandam
Bayilvan Ranganathan
Loose Mohan

Soundtrack

The music was composed by Ganesh (of Shankar-Ganesh), with lyrics written by Vaali. Soundtrack was released under audio label Sree Devi Audio.

Reception
Malini Mannath of The Indian Express gave the film a negative review and said, "it becomes a severe test of your patience especially if the script is mediocre and insipid". K. Vijiyan of New Straits Times gave a more positive review, praising the film's comedy. R. P. R. of Kalki said Rama Narayanan, moving away from elements Amman, Shamili, monkey, elephant and collaborating with Visu, had tried to provide laughter but the film looks similar to the appearance of the last period of ADMK-Congress alliance and concluded that someone said that this was completed the film in sixteen days; the rush seemed evident inch by inch.

References

External links

1994 films
1990s Tamil-language films
Films directed by Rama Narayanan
1994 comedy films
Fiction about God
Indian religious comedy films
Films scored by Shankar–Ganesh